Master of Middle-earth: The Fiction of J. R. R. Tolkien is a 1972 book of literary criticism of J. R. R. Tolkien's Middle-earth fantasy writings, written by Paul H. Kocher, and one of the few to be published in Tolkien's lifetime. It focuses especially on the best-selling novel The Lord of the Rings and The Hobbit, and also covers some of his minor works such as "Leaf by Niggle" and "Smith of Wootton Major". At a time when scholars were largely critical of Tolkien and his prose style, it both praised his writing and, in the absence of Christopher Tolkien's The History of Middle-earth on the process of creation of Tolkien's fiction, it correctly guessed many of his major themes. It was one of the earliest book-length analyses of Tolkien's work, winning Kocher the 1973 Mythopoeic Society's Scholarship in Inkling Studies Award.

Context 

Paul H. Kocher was a scholar of English literature. He wrote extensively on the works of J. R. R. Tolkien as well as on Elizabethan English drama, philosophy, religion, and medicine. 

In 1973 Kocher won the Mythopoeic Society's Scholarship in Inkling Studies Award for Master of Middle-Earth. The book was published before The Silmarillion appeared (1977) to resolve several of the questions to which Kocher guesses the answer, usually correctly.

Book

Publication history 

The book was first published in hardback by Houghton Mifflin in the United States in October 1972. The first British edition was brought out by Thames & Hudson in hardback in 1973, with the title Master of Middle-earth: The Achievement of J.R.R. Tolkien. Paperback editions followed: by Penguin Books in 1974, Ballantine Books in 1977, Pimlico in 2002, and Del Rey in 2003. The book has been translated into Dutch, French, German, Italian, Polish, and Swedish. Versions include: 

—— published in Britain as Master of Middle-Earth: The Achievement of J. R. R. Tolkien. London: Thames and Hudson, 1973.
—— reprinted several times, such as in New York: Ballantine Books, 1977; New York: Del Rey, 1982 and 2003; and London: Pimlico, 2002. 

Translations include:

—— French by Jean Markale as Le royaume de la terre du milieu: Les clés de l'oeuvre de J.R.R. Tolkien. Paris: Retz, 1981. 
—— Italian, Il maestro della Terra di Mezzo, Rome: Bompiani, 2011. 
—— Swedish by Åke Ohlmarks, Tolkiens sagovärld: En vägledning. Stockholm: AWE/Geber, 1989; and Stockholm: Geber, 1973. 
—— Dutch by Max Schuchart, Tolkien: Meester van midden-aarde: Zijn romans en verhalen. The Hague: Bert Bakker, 1973. 
—— Polish by Radosław Kot as Mistrz Śródziemia. Warsaw: Amber, 1998.

Synopsis 

The book has seven chapters, a "Bibliographical Note" on Tolkien's publications, academic notes, and a full index. The chapters cover:

1. "Middle-earth: An Imaginary World" – how Tolkien blends fantasy and reality to create his world

2. "The Hobbit" – on the quality of Tolkien's best-selling children's book

3. "Cosmic Order" – on the cosmology of Middle-earth, from the role of Wizards to the godlike Valar

4. "Sauron and the Nature of Evil" – on the questions of evil and the temptation of the Ring, including other evil figures like Saruman and Shelob

5. "The Free Peoples" – on how skilfully Tolkien portrays different peoples, cultures, and languages by varying his prose

6. "Aragorn" – arguing that the ranger who becomes King is the real hero of The Lord of the Rings

7. "Seven Leaves" – on seven of Tolkien's minor works: "Leaf by Niggle", The Lay of Aotrou and Itroun, Farmer Giles of Ham, The Homecoming of Beorhtnoth Beorhthelm's Son, Smith of Wootton Major, Imram, and The Adventures of Tom Bombadil

Reception 

Charles W. Nelson, in Journal of the Fantastic in the Arts, noting that the book was one of the first scholarly studies of Tolkien, wrote in 1994 that it contained "one of the most complete discussions of love and emotional attachments in the trilogy, including a fascinating treatment of self-love and its injurious affects on the evil characters".

The Jesuit priest John L. Treloar wrote in Mythlore that Kocher notices Tolkien's tendency to move away from personifying evil towards making it an abstract entity, but ascribes this to Tolkien's familiarity as a Roman Catholic with the writings of Thomas Aquinas. Treloar argues that Aquinas derived his concepts from Saint Augustine. He explains that Augustine had argued that God is entirely good, making it awkward to explain how evil could exist; Augustine wrestled with this, concluding that everything that God had created was good in the beginning. Treloar writes that the artist in Tolkien would have been attracted by Augustine's struggle. He notes that Kocher was writing without the help of The Silmarillion; with that in place, Tolkien's Augustinian view of evil as the absence of good is seen to be "even more pervasive [in Middle-earth] than Kocher realizes".

The scholar of religion Paul Nolan Hyde wrote in Religious Educator that Kocher was one of the early scholars who took Tolkien seriously, praising rather than decrying his prose style and his "real mastery as a writer" which (he quotes Kocher) "consists in his power to establish for each individual race a personality that is unmistakably its own. A dwarf is as different from an elf as an ent from a hobbit, and all from a man and from one another. Further, each race has not only its gifts but also its private tragedy, which it must try to overcome as best it can. And it must work out its own often difficult way of living with its peers. All this imparts great variety and drama to the epic within the broader movement of events." 
The scholar of English literature, Glenn Edward Sadler, reviewing the book in Christianity Today, wrote that Kocher had provided a "survey narrative", both scholarly and readable, of Tolkien's blend of reality and fantasy. The book ably described Tolkien's "theory of artistic creation (secondary world building), major philosophical and religious ideas, and moral imperatives", and evaluated his construction of myth.

The evolutionary psychiatrist and blogger Bruce Charlton wrote that the book was the "first really good piece of book length critical work" on Tolkien, noting that it came out just before Tolkien's death. It thus embodied "a lost perspective", absent all Tolkien's posthumously-published writings, including the 12-volume The History of Middle-earth which appeared in the following decades. In Charlton's view, the book therefore has permanent value. He notes that Kocher flags up or discusses in detail nearly all the key points about Tolkien, making educated inferences that were later confirmed by Christopher Tolkien's lengthy research among his father's papers.

References 

1972 books
Books about Middle-earth